Head-Royce School (Head-Royce or HRS) is a private co-educational college-preparatory K-12 school in Oakland, California. The forerunner of Head-Royce was the Anna Head School for Girls in Berkeley, founded in 1887. Relocated to its current site in 1964, Anna Head School for Girls merged with the neighboring Royce School in 1979 to form the present-day Head-Royce School.

Head-Royce is composed of three divisions. The Lower School consists of kindergarten through 5th grade. The Middle School is composed of the 6th, 7th, and 8th grades. Finally, the Upper School encompasses 9th through 12th grades. Most new students enter Head-Royce in kindergarten, 6th grade, or 9th grade.

History
The school was founded in 1887 by Anna Head as the Anna Head School for Girls in Berkeley, California.

In 1955, the University of California, Berkeley acquired the school's property by writ of eminent domain. The school was relocated to the Oakland Hills, and a new campus was constructed by 1964.

In 1971, the school's Board of Trustees established a co-ordinate school for boys, The Royce School, named in honor of philosopher (and Anna Head's brother-in-law), Josiah Royce. In 1979, the schools completed the transition to become a fully co-educational school, with its current name.

Nearly one half of the students and one third of the employees are people of color.  One quarter of the student body receives financial assistance..

Admissions and tuition
Evaluation for acceptance depends upon the division to which the applicant wishes to be admitted. The admissions process for the high school is generally composed of testing through a proprietary test or an Independent School Entrance Examination (ISEE), transcript and relevant history, recommendations, and an interview; in addition, a student evaluation may influence the final decision. Head-Royce claims a selective admissions rate that is competitive with many American colleges.

Tuition for previous school years (USD):

Head-Royce participates in the National Association of Independent Schools' School and Student Service for Financial Aid. In 2014, $4,000,000 worth of need-based grants was provided to K-12 students.

Academics and student life
Head-Royce students complete a college-preparatory curriculum including mandatory courses in English; mathematics; American history; European history; physics; chemistry; biology; foreign language; fine arts; and physical education, as well as a rotating group of elective courses in science, English and history in the senior year. These senior elective courses have covered such topics as astronomy, robotics, Shakespeare, Japanese literature, psychology, the history of Islam, and many others. Some courses specifically prepare students for Advanced Placement exams in the subject. The vast majority of students take at least three AP exams by the end of high school, with many students opting to take six or more exams.

Additional graduation requirements include completion of a prescribed amount of approved community service activity, and completion of a "senior project" in lieu of final exams at the end of the senior year, involving logging 80 hours toward a specific endeavor of the student's choosing.

Graduating-class sizes are generally 85–95 students. The school has a 100 percent (in some years nearly 100 percent) matriculation rate to four-year colleges, especially University of California schools and elite private institutions.

The 77 students in the class of 2006 had average SAT scores of 674 Critical Reading, 676 Math and 673 Writing.
This class contained 15 National Merit commended students, 17 National Merit semi-finalists, 15 finalists and 3 National Merit Scholarship winners.

The school newspaper is The Hawk's Eye, which publishes monthly.

Campus

The Head-Royce campus was built in a ravine adjacent to Lincoln Avenue in Oakland. The current campus consists of three distinct areas, coinciding with the three "divisions."

The Lower School is in the lowest and most western part of the ravine and contains classrooms for the kindergarten to 5th grade. The lower school also has a vegetable garden, a courtyard, a play structure and a basketball court.

The middle school building is farther east and uphill. This houses 6th, 7th and 8th grade classrooms, the Community Room and Auditorium, vocal and instrumental music rooms, art studios, a computer lab, a ceramics studio, a drama room and an art gallery.

Next to the fine arts classrooms and parallel to Lincoln Avenue is the World Languages Building, a two-level building dedicated to the middle and upper school language classes (Latin, French, Spanish, and Mandarin).

The World Languages Building is one of three new buildings built around the main courtyard of the upper school. The other two buildings are the Read Library and the main upper school building. The latter houses the Jayhawk Café, English, history, math, and science classrooms, including two biology labs and two chemistry labs.

The building parallel to the main upper school building houses additional math, history, language, and science (specifically physics) classrooms. This building is connected to the Paul Chapman Pavilion (the gym) which includes a weight room. Further east of the gym is the outdoor basketball court, the tennis courts, the athletics field, and the parking lot.

In 2013, the school acquired eight acres on the south side of Lincoln from the Lincoln Child Center.  In December 2018, the school submitted an application for a new master plan for a campus on both sides of Lincoln Avenue with an underground link between the two properties.

Athletics

Head-Royce's mascot is a Jayhawk named Tuffy. The high school competes as a member of the Bay Counties League - East (BCL East). The middle school competes as a member of the Bay Area Interscholastic Athletic League (BAIAL). Its rival is The College Preparatory School, commonly known as 'CPS'.

Athletic facilities on campus include the Paul Chapman Pavilion (commonly referred to as "the gym") for basketball and volleyball, three tennis courts (each named), and the Farley Field with the Jesse Becherer Diamond for soccer, baseball, softball, and lacrosse. Head-Royce also has several small practice basketball courts spread around campus. A new drainage system was installed underneath the field in the winter of 2005–2006 to prevent mud patches which had become a problem. The school has also installed a running path on a hill above the field which can be used for recreational running. A swimming pool is on campus for lower school swim lessons, PE classes, and the swim team, but it is not of regulation size and therefore does not host many meets. The golf team plays at Lake Chabot Golf Course, which is near the school. No plans to improve the athletic facilities have so far been revealed in the master plan.

In the 2005–2006 school year, the middle school varsity boys teams (high school class of 2010) went undefeated and won the championship in all three of their sports (soccer, basketball, and baseball). This is the first time in league history that the same school has won all three championships and gone undefeated in the three sports.

The high school men's varsity basketball team and women's varsity soccer team have won the BCL championship six years in a row. In the 2006 season, the women's varsity volleyball team won the BCL championship. The men's varsity soccer program has been extremely successful with multiple BCL championships and two NCS Championship appearances in the last 4 years. The men's varsity volleyball program were BCL champions in 2006 and 2007 and came in second in NCS in 2006. In 2009, the men's varsity baseball program won the NCS Championship. In 2010 the men's varsity soccer, basketball, and tennis programs all won the BCL championship. The 2012–2013 women's varsity soccer team made history by advancing all the way to the NCS Championship game.

In 2016, the women's varsity volleyball team won the CIF State Division V championship, the first statewide team championship in the school's history.

In 2017, the men's varsity soccer team won the North Coast Sectional (NCS) Division 2 title vs. Making Waves Academy by a score of 2-1. It was the first men's varsity soccer title win in school history. The Jayhawks ended the season 18-1, and ranked as the top men's team in the state of California for the fall soccer season .

Sports

Fall
Boys'/Men's Soccer (MS, HS)
Girls'/Women's Volleyball (MS, HS)
Women's Tennis (HS)
Cross Country (MS, HS)

Winter
Boy's/Men's Basketball (MS, HS)
Girls'/Women's Basketball (7–8, HS)
Girls' Soccer (MS, 6th only)

Spring
Baseball (MS, HS)
Softball (HS)
Men's Tennis (HS)
Girls' Basketball (6)
Women's Soccer (11–1, HS)
Men's Volleyball (HS)
Swimming (HS)
Track and field (HS)
Golf (MS, HS)
Lacrosse (MS, HS)

Notable alumni

Peter Alexander (journalist) – US National News Correspondent NBC
Rebecca Alexander – psychotherapist and author
Josh Birnbaum – American businessman who serves as managing director at Goldman Sachs
Jane Connell – actress
Adam Duritz – Singer of Counting Crows
Claire Falkenstein – sculptor and painter
California Gibson – rancher and politician
Cynthia Holcomb Hall – United States federal judge
Nico Hoerner – MLB shortstop for the Chicago Cubs 
Helen Hull Jacobs – Tennis champion
MC Lars – post-punk laptop rapper
Steven J. Law – Former Deputy Secretary of Labor
Helen Wills Moody – Tennis champion
Margaret Wentworth Owings – American environmentalist
Libby Schaaf – American politician serving as the Mayor of Oakland, California
Suki Schorer – ballet dancer
C.C. van Asch van Wijck – Dutch artist, model and sculptor
Daniel Wu – Hong Kong film actor
Krista Marie Yu – actress
Malika Andrews - American Journalist And Reporter.  ESPN Sports Analyst And Host Of NBA Today.

References

External links
Head-Royce School Official Website
Head-Royce School Master Plan

School buildings on the National Register of Historic Places in California
Educational institutions established in 1887
Private K-12 schools in California
Bay Counties League East
High schools in Oakland, California
National Register of Historic Places in Oakland, California
1887 establishments in California